William Anthony Maragh (born 25 June 1963), also known as Super Cat, is a Jamaican deejay who achieved widespread popularity during the late 1980s and early 1990s dancehall movement. His nickname, "Wild Apache", was given to him by his mentor Early B. Super Cat is considered one of the greatest deejays in the history of the Jamaican dancehall scene.

Biography
Born to an Afro-Jamaican mother and Indo-Jamaican father, Super Cat was raised in Kingston's tough Seivright Gardens neighbourhood, then known as Cockburn Pen, home to ground-breaking deejays like Prince Jazzbo and U-Roy. At the age of seven the Soul Imperial sound system allowed him to assist them at a local club called Bamboo Lawn. He auditioned for Joe Gibbs as a singer but was unsuccessful.

He began appearing as a deejay under the name Cat-A-Rock, but soon switched to the name Super Cat. He also appeared as 'Wild Apache'. His first single "Mr. Walker", produced by Winston Riley, was released in 1981 and established his recording career. He went on to record for Jah Thomas ("Walkathon", on which he was billed as 'Super Cat the Indian'), but his career was interrupted by a period of incarceration. After his release he began working with Early B on the Killamanjaro sound system in 1984, and his debut album, Si Boops Deh!, was released in 1985, and included the hit singles "Boops" (which was based on Steely & Clevie's updated "Feel Like Jumping" rhythm and sparked a craze for songs about sugar daddies), and "Cry Fi De Youth", establishing his style of dancehall with conscious lyrics.

He started his own Wild Apache Productions label and began producing his own recordings, including the 1988 album Sweets for My Sweet. He featured on the album Cabin Stabbin in 1991 along with Nicodemus and Junior Demus. He had been scheduled to perform at the One Love concert in the UK in 1991, but his appearance was cancelled after the shooting death of Nitty Gritty, for which Super Cat was initially suspected but cleared in 1992. Continuing success saw him move to the United States and sign a contract with Columbia Records, releasing one of the first dancehall albums on a major label, Don Dada (1992). The following year, Sony Music issued The Good, the Bad, the Ugly, and the Crazy, teaming Super Cat with Nicodemus, Junior Demus and Junior Cat.

Super Cat had a number of hit singles in the early 1990s, including "Don Dada", "Ghetto Red Hot" and "Dem No Worry We" with Heavy D. In 1992, he was featured on the remix of "Jump" with Kris Kross, and he also collaborated with them in 1993 for their song "Alright". These hits made him The Source magazine dance hall artist of the year in 1993. He was also an early collaborator with The Notorious B.I.G., featuring the then unknown artist (along with Mary J. Blige, 3rd Eye and Puff Daddy) on the B-side remix of "Dolly My Baby" in 1993. The title song, "Don Dada" was a reply to many jabs made by Ninjaman.

His version of Fats Domino's "My Girl Josephine", performed with Jack Radics, was included in the soundtrack to the film Prêt-à-Porter in 1994. In 1997, he was featured on the hit single "Fly" by Sugar Ray from their album Floored. He collaborated with India.Arie on her hit song "Video" in 2001, and with Jadakiss and The Neptunes on "The Don of Dons" in 2003. Also in 2003, he collaborated with 112 for their song "Na Na Na Na". Following the death of his longtime road manager Fred 'The Thunder' Donner in 2004, Super Cat released a multi-cd tribute album entitled Reggaematic Diamond All-Stars that featured contributions from Yami Bolo, Michael Prophet, Linval Thompson, Nadine Sutherland and Sizzla among others.

Super Cat reappeared on the national reggae scene in 2009 for a show at Madison Square Garden with Buju Banton and Barrington Levy. He also headlined the 'Best of the Best' concert in Miami in 2008, with Assassin, Etana, Barrington Levy, Buju Banton, Junior Reid, Tony Matterhorn, Sizzla and Beenie Man.

In 2012, his song "Dance Inna New York" was sampled for Nas' single "The Don", from the rapper's album Life Is Good, with Cat adding vocals to the hook.

Super Cat made a surprise appearance at Massive B's on Da Reggae Tip concert in September 2013 during the set of Shaggy. That same week, a mix of his work previously recorded during his time with The Neptunes label was released to the internet. In May 2014 he headlined the Reggae on the Bay festival in Trinidad.

Super Cat is the elder brother of reggae artist Junior Cat and first cousin of reggae singer Marcia Griffiths.

Discography

Albums
Si Boops Deh! (1985), Techniques
Boops! (1986), Nick Crompton
Sweets for My Sweet (1988), Wild Apache
Cabin Stabbin (1991), Wild Apache—with Nicodemus & Junior Demus
Don Dada (1992), Columbia/SME
Good, the Bad, the Ugly & the Crazy (1994), Columbia/SME—with Nicodemus, Junior Demus and Junior Cat
The Struggle Continues (1995), Columbia/SME
Take 2 (2003), Columbia/SME—with Mad Cobra
Reggaematic Diamond All-Stars (2004), Wild Apache

Charted singles

DVD
Pick of the Past Keeling Reggae – with Nicodemus, Junior Demus, Louie Rankin, and Nick Crompton

References

External links
Wild Apache Productions
[ Super Cat on Allmusic]
Super Cat at Dancehall Reggae

1963 births
Living people
Musicians from Kingston, Jamaica
Jamaican dancehall musicians
Reggae fusion artists
Columbia Records artists
Jamaican reggae musicians
Jamaican people of Dougla descent